Margaret Laird is the name of:

Margaret B. Laird (1871–1968), leader in the women's suffrage movement in New Jersey
Margaret Heather Laird (1933–2014), British teacher and senior laywoman in the Church of England
Margaret Nicholl Laird (1897–1983), American Baptist missionary

See also
 Lesley Margaret Laird (née Langan; born 1958), Scottish politician 
 Lindsay Margaret Laird (1949–2001), British biologist